The NEC PC-100 was a Japanese home computer available on October 13, 1983. It operated on 8086 CPU 7 MHz, 128KB RAM, 128KB VRAM, a Japanese language capable keyboard and a two button mouse. It had three models and its color monitor, PC-KD651, which could be used vertically or horizontally, had the price tag of 198,000 yen. Its biggest advantage over other computers of that time was its high graphical capability of 720 by 512 with a selection of 16 color out of 512 color available on its high end model30. Its OS was MS-DOS and was also equipped with a spreadsheet program Maruchipuran (Multiplan) and a text editor JS-WORD as well as the game Lode Runner.

The development was operated by NEC Electronic Device Business Group, ASCII  (Microsoft dealer in Japan) and Cybernet Kogyo, a subsidiary of Kyocera.

Far ahead of its time and too costly, PC-100 did not sell well. A complete set with the printer PC-PR201 that could print alphabet, hiragana, katakana and kanji, came to nearly a million yen. For a comparison, the Nintendo Family Computer released in July of the same year was only 14,800 yen and the vaunted Apple Lisa 2 sold for 2.2 million yen. The cheaper PC-9801F2 also by NEC outsold it. 

 model10 (398,000 yen) - a 5-inch 2D (360KB) floppy disk drive
 model20 (448,000 yen) - two 5-inch 2D floppy disk drives
 model30 (558,000 yen) - two 5-inch 2D floppy disk drives

Competition with PC-98 
NEC faded out the PC-100 because of the reorganization of their business units rather than its technical issues.

The Electronic Device Business Group launched the PC-8001 in 1979, making NEC the biggest PC vendor in Japan. However, the Japanese personal computer industry had just begun, and it was unclear which market would grow. Other large computer manufacturers, IBM Japan and Fujitsu, had not focused on the personal computer industry yet. Hitachi and Sharp released home computers for hobbyists. Sord and Oki Electric Industry released personal computers for small-business sector.

In 1981, NEC expanded personal computer lines into three groups: NEC Home Electronics, Information Processing Business Group and Electronic Device Business Group, with each specializing in a particular series. The Electronic Device Business Group developed the PC-8801 for consumers who wanted to use it for both hobby and business. The Information Processing Business Group began developing the PC-9801 specialized for business market.

By 1983, the Japanese personal computer industry grew greatly, and its distribution network became complex. It caused the problem for NEC that each group competed to sell its own product to the same chain. Their biggest competitor was each group in the company, and they contested for the leadership. One software company's president recalled the sales section of PC-9801 often said "Down with the 88!".

The PC-100 and PC-9801F were released at the same time, and the problem surfaced. A store manager complained he couldn't determine which salesperson to follow. In December 1983, NEC decided to consolidate personal computer business into two divisions: NEC Home Electronics to deal with the 8-bit home computer line, and Nippon Electric's Information Processing Business Group to deal with the 16-bit personal computer line. The Electronic Device Business Group passed off their personal computer business to NEC Home Electronics. NEC Home Electronics discontinued development of the PC-100, PC-6000 series, PC-6600 series and PC-8000 series, and these lines were merged to the PC-8800 series to concentrate on the home computer market.

Trivia
Possibly due to the standard inclusion of a mouse, a blue anime style mouse with "PC-100" on its chest looking little like Superman was used as a promotional character.

References

External links
パソコンの歴史　１９８３年 - timeline

Pc-0100
8086-based home computers
Computer-related introductions in 1983